Association for Renaissance Martial Arts (ARMA) is a US-based  non-profit organization dedicated to the study and practice of historical European martial arts of the 15th to 17th centuries.

ARMA was formed in 2001 under director John Clements as a continuation of the Historical Armed Combat Association (HACA, since 1992).  As of 2006, the ARMA claimed a number of close to 500 paying members.   They also list a number of "Academic Consultants".

History 
The ARMA began in 1992 as the Historical Armed Combat Association (HACA), a group led principally by Hank Reinhardt, an avid sword enthusiast. Reinhardt's idea was to provide an umbrella organization for individuals interested in Western swords and historical weaponry. In 1993, John Clements took over the HACA, 1993 saw the beginning of reforms within the organization and the foundation of  its first Study Group. HACA began focusing more intently on the study and interpretation of the historical source literature of Renaissance Martial Arts, much of which was presented on the website along with example training methods.

In 2001, the decision was made for the HACA to expand and evolve into what was believed would be a more effective educational organization for the study and practice of Medieval and Renaissance fencing. An efficient study curriculum for practice had also been developed at this time using the source literature. 
As one of the changes, the organization was renamed "the ARMA." 2001 also saw the introduction of a "national training program" (a series of seminars and workshops), ranking and certifications in the curricula, and the implementation of the basic philosophy and methodology used by the ARMA today.

The ARMA's conceptualization was also influenced by the work of Sydney Anglo, as presented in his work, The Martial Arts of Renaissance Europe (Yale University Press 2000),  hailed as the first academic treatment of Western martial arts in English.

During the ARMA International Event in August, 2009, ARMA Director John Clements introduced to the ARMA membership a new curriculum for the Martial Arts of Renaissance Europe (MARE), referred to within ARMA as the "Rosetta Stone". Clements intended this new curriculum as based on "how the historical masters were teaching the art".

In September 2010 the ARMA became an official representative for the Martial Arts of Renaissance Europe (MARE) to the World Martial Arts Union (WoMAU).

Curriculum
The ARMA aims at a reconstruction of historical techniques, avoiding "borrowings" from living traditions of martial arts or classical fencing.

Wooden wasters and steel feather swords (Federschwert) are used for basic drilling and technique work, up to and including free-play. Padded contact-weapons, along with helmets and appropriate padding, were previously used for more intense free-play, including sparring at full speed and power, though these have fallen out of favor.  Sharp replica swords are used only for testcutting and to teach students proper edge control and cutting technique.

The body of training techniques and methods used by the ARMA is referred to as Armatura and includes distance and timing drills, footwork and cutting drills, striking and counter-strike exercises, grappling elements, and flourish drills.

The ARMA curriculum encompasses a variety of weapons and weapon combinations, armored and unarmored, including longsword, greatsword, single sword (cut & thrust), sword & buckler, sword & dagger, Messer, rapier, rapier & dagger, single dagger, polearm, and short staff. Kampfringen, a historical system of unarmed combat, is also taught, both as it relates to fighting with weapons and as a separate discipline.

Organization

Associate Members and Study Groups
Upon joining the ARMA, new members receive learning material. Lone members are Associates and three or four members who work together locally may apply to form official Study Groups.  Non-members are allowed limited practice with members and Study Groups, but are encouraged to join the organization.

In addition, regional Study Days, member Workshop events, and National Training Program Seminars are frequently held, and members in a given area will probably have the opportunity to attend at least one annually. Larger international gatherings are held less frequently. In both cases, senior students and expert instructors are invited to present classes, lectures, and National Training Program seminars to attendees. ARMA members are given priority in these events, and non-members may be prohibited from participating in certain Workshops. However, one- and two-day "open workshops" are offered in which non-member may attend.

Outside the USA, there are Study Groups in Poland, Mexico, and Greece.

ARMA's forum is also an important means of community discussion within the organization, and currently contains over one thousand registered users.

National Training Program
The National Training Program acts as the core instructive curriculum of ARMA, offering basic fundamental knowledge to participants so that they may study and progress on their own. The program content is a composite approach derived from the teachings of a variety of historical masters, and specifically designed for students and practitioners over extended distances who are without the benefit of competent instruction or practice partners. All of the knowledge required for rank advancement within the ARMA is covered in the NTP.

The National Training Program provides training in six main areas, each featuring some subsets. These are the Longsword (NTP 1.x), the Sword and Dagger (NTP 2.x), the Rapier (NTP 3.x), unarmed fighting (NTP 4.x), dagger fighting (NTP 5.x), and armoured fighting (NTP 6.x). However, the ARMA currently focuses on the Longsword, Sword and Dagger, and the Rapier as foundational instructional principles.

Uniform and Rankings
The uniform worn by members of the ARMA consists of a red T-shirt and black sweatpants. 
Non-members who practice with ARMA study groups are encouraged to wear a white T-shirt and black sweatpants. 
ARMA members of Provost rank wear instead a black T-shirt with red pants. (Senior students may also assume this uniform when offering instruction at official seminars.) There is also a recognized but optional ARMA formal "dress uniform," which consists of period-style clothing in the same color scheme.

ARMA ranking is somewhat informal, and is based on the four-tiered system employed by the London Company of Masters, "Scholar", "Free Scholar",  "Provost" and "Master".

All ARMA members are considered to possess the rank of "Scholar". Scholars who achieve sufficient command of the Armatura and basic principles of the ARMA program, and a matching knowledge of the fighting manuals and historical masters, are advanced to the rank of "Scholar Adept". Scholar Adepts who demonstrate considerable expertise in all areas of the ARMA training program and an advanced knowledge of the source material are considered for "Free Scholar" rank. Testing for either rank involves an extensive oral examination and the physical demonstration of technique, as determined by the instructors conducting the test. Qualifying for Free Scholar rank also requires a Prize Playing.  Free Scholar testing may be administered by any Free Scholar. Free Scholar certification requires the oversight of two or more Free Scholars or the Director; by custom, as many Free Scholars as can be gathered are present to oversee such a test.

Unlike rankings in most martial arts organizations, Free Scholar rankings must be renewed; if a scholar has not advanced to a higher rank within four years of playing his prize, he must be retested in order to retain his current status. Free Scholar rankings are earned in a specific weapon, and a candidate must achieve a rank with the longsword before testing for any other weapon. At the present time, there are seven Free Scholars in the longsword, and no rank has been awarded in any other weapon (though such rank likely will be once the curricula for other weapons is fully established).

Above Free Scholar are the ranks of Provost, Senior Provost, and Master. At present the only holder of the rank Provost is former ARMA Deputy Director Aaron Pynynberg (now no longer part of ARMA). The ARMA considers it highly inappropriate at this juncture to consider naming any ARMA practitioner a "Master" of these extinct arts, as the ARMA believes that the restoration of Medieval and Renaissance martial arts is still in its infancy and no modern practitioner has contributed to the art enough to claim the title of "Master".

Outside of this system, there is a purely academic distinction called "Senior Researcher" that is granted to ARMA scholars who contribute significantly to the general body of knowledge on historical fencing. The ARMA also has over a dozen "Expert Consultants" from different fields who have offered their knowledge and expertise to its efforts.

See also

Swordsmanship

References

External links
Association for Renaissance Martial Arts
Medieval Fight Book (2011).  A National Geographic show on the fight book of German fight master Hans Talhoffer
Podcast 39: Chivalry in Renaissance Martial Arts by Scott Farrell, February 24, 2010.   An interview of John Clements, the director of the Association for Renaissance Martial Arts, on how the ideals of chivalry shaped, and were reflected in the culture and practices of civilian and military combat training in the 16th and 17th centuries.

Historical European martial arts revival
Martial arts organizations
Non-profit organizations based in the United States